One of several tornado outbreaks in the United States to take place during the record month of April 2011, 49 tornadoes were produced across the Midwest and Southeast from April 9–11. Widespread damage took place; however, no fatalities resulted from the event due to timely warnings. In Wisconsin, 16 tornadoes touched down, ranking this outbreak as the state's largest April event on record as well as one of the largest single-day events during the course of any year. The strongest tornado of the outbreak was an EF4 tornado that touched down west of Pocahontas, Iowa on April 9, a short-lived satellite to a long-track EF3 tornado. Between 0256 and 0258 UTC (9:56 and 9:58 p.m. CDT) that day, five tornadoes were on the ground simultaneously in Pocahontas County, Iowa, all of which were from one supercell thunderstorm. Other tornadoes impacted parts of eastern Kentucky and Tennessee on April 9, hours before the event in Iowa.

Throughout Iowa, damage from the storms was estimated at $78.6 million, much of which likely took place in and around Mapleton, which was struck by an EF3 tornado on April 9. In addition to the tornadoes, Texas experienced a widespread straight-line wind and hail event, leaving $100 million in damage. Overall, losses from the storm system reached $2.2 billion, making it the third of a record sixteen billion dollar disasters in 2011.

Meteorological synopsis
A large storm system with an associated frontal boundary moved northward and eastward across the central United States beginning on April 8. While initial severe weather was limited, a lone supercell broke out ahead of a mesoscale convective system in Pulaski County, Virginia on the eastern end of the warm front that evening. Two tornadoes were confirmed, one of which was an EF2 that caused severe damage in Pulaski, Virginia. Numerous houses were damaged and eight people were injured. An outbreak began across the United States during the afternoon of April 9; supercells developed along the warm front and tracked through parts of Kentucky, Tennessee, Virginia, and North Carolina, generating softball sized hail and eight more tornadoes.

At the same time, a progressive upper-level trough moved east out of the Rocky Mountains and over the Midwest. Owing to early morning thunderstorms, moisture levels in the central Great Plains increased; however, capping in the region would limit daytime activity before atmospheric instability allowed for severe weather. Forecast models indicated that the low-level jetstream would produce significant wind shear, aiding in the formation of possible tornadic supercell thunderstorms, and convective available potential energy (CAPE) values could exceed 3,000 J/kg. In light of this, the Storm Prediction Center (SPC) stated a moderate risk of severe weather for areas around the Minnesota-Iowa border. A slight risk was also defined for a broader region surrounding the moderate as well as a narrow line extending southward to Texas. A warm front began developing along the southeastern side of the low pressure area as it moved over The Dakotas.

During the evening hours of April 9, the SPC issued a tornado watch for western and northern Iowa, eastern Nebraska and southeast South Dakota. Conditions within this region were favorable for the development of multiple tornadic storms and there was a 70 percent chance of multiple touchdowns. Around 22:50 UTC (5:50 p.m. CDT), a strong thunderstorm developed over Burt/Cuming Counties in northeastern Nebraska. This cell slowly tracked east-northeastward and developed into a supercell as it moved into Monona County, Iowa. At 00:20 UTC (7:20 p.m. Within minutes, this storm quickly grew and intensified as it moved closer to the city. The tornado passed directly over the city at low-end EF3 strength. A separate EF2 tornado struck the town of Early, where considerable damage occurred to homes and businesses.

Tracking northeastward, the supercell moved into Ida County, another tornado touched down around 01:20 UTC (8:20 p.m. CDT) to the west of Arthur. Around the same time, the cell entered Sac County and the first in a series of multiple tornadoes touched down northwest of Odebolt. Over the following three hours, 14 tornadoes touched down across Sac, Buena Vista, and Pocahontas counties. At 02:08 UTC (9:08 p.m. Remaining on the ground for an hour, this tornado meandered along a  path, producing several satellite tornadoes, including a short-lived EF4 tornado west of Pocahontas.

Officials blocked off the town and Governor Terry Branstad issued a disaster proclamation for the town. Early estimates indicated that 60% of the town was damaged and 20% was nearly flattened. Despite the damage, only three people sustained minor injuries.

On April 10, another moderate risk was issued. A PDS Tornado Watch was issued for parts of Minnesota, Michigan, and Iowa, as well as most of Wisconsin. With 16 confirmed tornadoes in Wisconsin, the outbreak ranked as the largest single-day event in April in the state. Severe damage occurred in the towns of Merrill, Kaukauna, and Cottonville. On the evening of April 10, a number of tornado watches and warning were issued stretching from southern Oklahoma to Sault. Ste. Marie, Michigan as well as central Ontario which became Canada's first tornado watch of the season. Thunderstorm watches and warnings were also reported as far away as northern and northwestern Ontario.

Confirmed tornadoes

April 9 event

April 10 event

April 11 event

Non-tornadic events
Accompanying the tornadoes, large hail and high winds also impacted parts of the Midwest. Initially, these events associated with the outbreak were confined to Iowa and parts of Nebraska and Minnesota on April 9. On April 10, a large line of severe storms produced damage from northern Minnesota southward to the Texas-Mexico border. Most damage along this line resulted from straight-line winds; however, Wisconsin,  diameter hail in La Crosse broke windows, dented cars and damaged homes. Roughly 3,200 insurance claims worth $12 million were later made in the city. Elsewhere in the state, winds up to  downed numerous trees and power lines and in some instances tore roofs of buildings.

In Texas, winds as high as  caused extensive damage to homes and businesses, resulting in roughly $100 million in damage. Numerous trees were felled across the region and a few structures were destroyed. In Dallas County, a few carports collapsed. Near Venus,  winds damaged five homes.

On April 11, a strong derecho brought widespread damage to much of northern Alabama as well as parts of Mississippi, Georgia and Tennessee.

Aftermath
Within days of the tornadoes in Iowa, excavators were brought in to clear debris and tear down homes that were damaged beyond repair. On May 5, nearly a month after the outbreak, President Barack Obama signed a federal disaster declaration for Buena Vista, Cherokee, Ida, Monona, Pocahontas and Sac Counties in Iowa. This allowed for government aid to be sent to the region and aid in recovery efforts. This declaration is set to remain in effect until May 1, 2012. A disaster outreach center was opened on May 6 at the Mapleton City Hall and the American Legion Post in Varina and would remain open through May 26. At these places, residents would be allowed to apply for small business and homeowner loans up to $2 million and $200,000 respectively.

See also
 List of North American tornadoes and tornado outbreaks
 List of tornadoes with confirmed satellite tornadoes

Notes

References

04-09
Tornadoes in Wisconsin
Tornadoes in Iowa
F4 tornadoes by date
Tornado,2011-04-09,Iowa-Wisconsin
Iowa-Wisconsin tornado outbreak